Emile Ramsammy (born December 11, 1962 in Trinidad, Trinidad and Tobago) is a Canadian thoroughbred horse racing Champion jockey. He had more than 500 victories racing in the Caribbean before emigrating to Canada in the early 1990s.

Ramsammy has won a number of important graded stakes races in Canada including the 1996 and 2006 Queen's Plate, the country's most prestigious race. He was voted the 1996 and 1997 Sovereign Award for Outstanding Jockey in Canada. In 2011 he won the Avelino Gomez Memorial Award for his contributions to the sport of Thoroughbred racing in Canada.

References
 Emile Ramsammy at the NTRA

Year-end charts

Canadian jockeys
Avelino Gomez Memorial Award winners
Sovereign Award winners
Trinidad and Tobago emigrants to Canada
Trinidad and Tobago jockeys
1962 births
Living people
Trinidad and Tobago sportsmen